The National Football League Draft is an annual sports draft in which NFL teams select newly eligible players for their rosters. To be eligible, a player must be out of high school for at least three years. Each NFL franchise seeks to add new players through the annual NFL Draft. The draft rules were last updated in 2009. The team with the worst record the previous year picks first, the next-worst team second, and so on. Teams also have the option to trade with another team to move up to a better draft position. Teams that did not make the playoffs are ordered by their regular-season record, with any remaining ties broken by strength of schedule. Playoff participants are sequenced after non-playoff teams, based on their round of elimination (wild card, division, conference, and Super Bowl).

From  through  the first selection was awarded by a random draw. The team which received this "bonus" pick forfeited its selection in the final round of the draft. The winner of the "bonus pick" was eliminated from the draw in future years. By 1958 all twelve clubs in the league at the time had received a bonus choice and the system was abolished.

Before the merger agreements in 1966, the American Football League (AFL) operated in direct competition with the NFL and held a separate draft. This led to a massive bidding war over top prospects between the two leagues, along with the subsequent drafting of the same player in each draft. As part of the merger agreement on June 8, 1966, the two leagues held a multiple round "common draft". Once the AFL officially merged with the NFL in 1970, the "common draft" simply became the NFL draft. The draft is one of the most notable events in American sports, with live broadcasts of it produced by ESPN, Fox and ABC.

Through the 2022 NFL Draft, 87 players have been selected first overall, with the most recent being Travon Walker from Georgia. The Indianapolis Colts and Los Angeles Rams have each made the most first overall selections in history with seven. Of the first overall draft picks, 43 have been selected to a Pro Bowl and of those 43, twelve have been inducted into the Pro Football Hall of Fame. While the Heisman Trophy is awarded annually to the most outstanding player in U.S. college football, only 21 of those Heisman winners have been selected first overall in the NFL draft. Six first overall draft pick players have been selected the NFL Rookie of the Year: Earl Campbell (1978); Billy Sims (1980); George Rogers (1981); Sam Bradford (2010); Cam Newton (2011); and Kyler Murray (2019).

Key

List of first overall picks

Statistics
The Denver Broncos, Baltimore Ravens, and Seattle Seahawks are the only teams that have never had the first overall pick.
 Nine teams have made the playoffs in the same season in which they made the first overall selection in the draft.  They were the 1968 Minnesota Vikings, 1978 Houston Oilers, 1982 New England Patriots, 1991 Dallas Cowboys, 2004 San Diego Chargers, 2008 Miami Dolphins, 2012 Indianapolis Colts, 2013 Kansas City Chiefs, and the 2022 Jacksonville Jaguars. 
 No team has ever gone from the first overall pick to a Super Bowl win in the same season.  The Minnesota Vikings lost Super Bowl IV the year after they had the first overall pick, the Dallas Cowboys lost Super Bowl X the year after they had the first overall pick, the New England Patriots lost Super Bowl XX the year after they had the first overall pick, and the Cincinnati Bengals lost Super Bowl LVI the year after they had the first overall pick.

First overall draft picks per team
The Indianapolis Colts and Los Angeles Rams have each held the first overall pick a total of seven times, the most of any NFL team. This includes the Colts' time in Baltimore and the Rams' time in Cleveland and St. Louis. The Boston Yanks are the only defunct franchise to have held a first overall pick.

Notes: (*) indicates the team selected first overall in their inaugural season.

First overall draft picks by school

Notre Dame, USC, Oklahoma, and Georgia are tied for most first overall picks with 5 each. Only two schools have had first overall picks in consecutive years: USC, with Ron Yary (1968) and O. J. Simpson (1969), and Oklahoma, with Baker Mayfield (2018) and Kyler Murray (2019).

First overall draft picks by position

See also
 List of second overall National Football League Draft picks
 Mr. Irrelevant – title given to the final player selected in an NFL draft

Notes

References

General

Specific